Aleksei Valeryevich Matyunin (born 16 March 1982) is a Russian professional football referee.

He has been a FIFA referee since 2017.

Personal life
His father Valeri Matyunin was a football player and, later, referee as well.

References

External links
 Profile by Russian Premier League

1982 births
Living people
Russian football referees